Multiple ships of the United States Navy have been named USS Vallejo in honor of Vallejo, California.

  was a  patrol gunboat, but was reclassified as patrol frigate  on 15 April 1943 and renamed  on 19 November 1943. Her contract was canceled 11 January 1944 before she was laid down.

See also
  was a  fleet ballistic missile submarine.

United States Navy ship names